The 1936–37 Montreal Maroons season was the 13th season of the NHL team. The team qualified for the playoffs and defeated the Boston Bruins in the first round, before losing to the New York Rangers in the second round.

Offseason

The Maroons and the Boston Bruins played a pre-season series of six games in eastern Canada. Each team won three games.

Tuesday, October 27 Bruins 2 Maroons 1 @ Saint John
Wednesday, October 28  Maroons 3 Bruins 1 @ Saint John
Thursday, October 29  Bruins 1 Maroons 0 @ Moncton
Saturday, October 31  Maroons 4 Bruins 0 @ Halifax
Monday, November 2 Bruins 3 Maroons 2 @ Halifax
Wednesday, November 4 Maroons 3 Bruins 1 @ Moncton

Regular season

Final standings

Record vs. opponents

Playoffs
The Maroons faced off against Boston in the first round in a best-of-three series and won it in three games, or 2–1.  They went against the Rangers in a best-of-three series and were swept in two games, or 0–2.

Schedule and results

Player stats

Regular season
Scoring

Goaltending

Playoffs
Scoring

Goaltending

Note: GP = Games played; G = Goals; A = Assists; Pts = Points; +/- = Plus/minus; PIM = Penalty minutes; PPG = Power-play goals; SHG = Short-handed goals; GWG = Game-winning goals
      MIN = Minutes played; W = Wins; L = Losses; T = Ties; GA = Goals against; GAA = Goals against average; SO = Shutouts;

Awards and records
Detroit Red Wings 1:0 Montreal Maroons 6 OT

Transactions

See also
1936–37 NHL season

References

External links

Montreal Maroons seasons
Montreal Maroons
Montreal Maroons